Horniblow is a surname. Notable people with the surname include:
Hilda Horniblow (1886–1950), English army officer and teacher
Dick Horniblow, Australian newspaper publisher